Salvia brachyloma is a perennial plant that is native to Yunnan and Sichuan provinces in China, growing on grassy slopes and forested grasslands at  elevation.

Notes

brachyloma
Flora of China